Bill Buckle (born 3 June 1943) is an Australian cricketer. He played in 23 first-class matches for Queensland between 1963 and 1972. Later in life he operated the Buckle Motors company, which produced the fibreglass-bodied Buckle Sports Coupe.

See also
 List of Queensland first-class cricketers

References

External links
 

1943 births
Living people
Australian cricketers
Queensland cricketers
Cricketers from Brisbane